He Zhili (born 30 September 1964 in Shanghai), also known by her married name , is a former table tennis world champion from China who later naturalized as a Japanese citizen and represented Japan under her married name.

Career

Asian Games
Representing China as He Zhili, she was the runner-up in both singles and doubles at the Seoul Games in 1986. 
Koyama won the 1994 Asian Games singles title in Hiroshima, Japan playing for her adopted country.

Asian Championships
She won gold in singles and silver in mixed doubles at the 7th Asian Championships held in 1983 in Islamabad, Pakistan.

World Championships
Representing China, she won the singles and team gold during the 1987 World Championships in New Delhi, India. However, she left the national team soon after as a result of her decision to not throw away matches to her teammates. The 1987 world championship semi-finals featured 3 Chinese women and the Korean Yang Young-Ja. In the first semi-final, China's Dai Lily led 18–12 in the final set but she blew the lead and lost 21–18 to Yang Young-Ja. It is alleged that the Chinese coaches (Zhang, Xielin) thought that Guan Jianhua had a better chance of beating Yang Young-Ja in the final, and ordered He Zhili to lose the semi-final. She refused to obey the order and won the match. The Chinese coaches had no option but to support her in the final to increase the country's tally of medals. Though He Zhili beat Yang Young-Ja, she left the team because of the incident and migrated to Japan.

Olympic Games
Koyama represented Japan at the 1996 Atlanta Games and 2000 Sydney Games. She reached the quarter final stage (singles) in both games.

Marriage
He Zhili married and later divorced, Hideyuki Koyama, a Japanese national and settled in Japan. She adopted her husband's surname (her given name “Chire” is the Japanese pronunciation  of the same Chinese characters of “Zhili”).

References

Japanese female table tennis players
Living people
1964 births
Table tennis players at the 2000 Summer Olympics
Table tennis players at the 1996 Summer Olympics
Olympic table tennis players of Japan
Chinese emigrants to Japan
People who lost Chinese citizenship
Naturalized citizens of Japan
Table tennis players from Shanghai
Asian Games medalists in table tennis
Table tennis players at the 1986 Asian Games
Table tennis players at the 1994 Asian Games
Medalists at the 1986 Asian Games
Medalists at the 1994 Asian Games
Chinese female table tennis players
Naturalised table tennis players
Asian Games silver medalists for China
Asian Games gold medalists for Japan
Asian Games bronze medalists for Japan
Japanese sportspeople of Chinese descent